The country of Solomon Islands includes portions of two archipelagoes - the southern portion of the Solomon Islands archipelago, and the Santa Cruz Islands, which are the northern extension of the Vanuatu archipelago. The geographic and ecological boundaries that define ecoregions can differ from political boundaries.

Terrestrial
The Solomon Islands are in the Australasian realm. The Solomon Islands' two terrestrial ecoregions are in the tropical and subtropical moist broadleaf forests biome.
 Solomon Islands rain forests (includes the neighboring Autonomous Region of Bougainville in Papua New Guinea)
 Vanuatu rain forests (includes the Santa Cruz Islands and neighboring Vanuatu)

Freshwater
 Solomon Islands (includes the Autonomous Region of Bougainville)

Marine
 Solomon Archipelago
 Vanuatu (includes Santa Cruz Islands)

References
 Wikramanayake, Eric; Eric Dinerstein; Colby J. Loucks; et al. (2002). Terrestrial Ecoregions of the Indo-Pacific: a Conservation Assessment. Island Press; Washington, DC.
 Freshwater Ecoregions of the World: A global biogeographical regionalization of the Earth's freshwater biodiversity. Accessed 30 March 2020. https://www.feow.org
 Spalding, Mark D., Helen E. Fox, Gerald R. Allen, Nick Davidson et al. "Marine Ecoregions of the World: A Bioregionalization of Coastal and Shelf Areas". Bioscience Vol. 57 No. 7, July/August 2007, pp. 573–583.

Ecoregions of the Solomon Islands
Solomon Islands
Ecoregions